"Britrock Must Be Destroyed" was a 2018 tour featuring British rock bands Reef, The Wildhearts and Terrorvision. Announced in November 2017, the tour was originally for eight dates across the UK in May 2018, and later extended to five dates in Australia, across August and September. In February 2018, UK Britpop band Dodgy were announced as the opening act for all UK dates.

On 27 July 2018 it was announced that, due to poor ticket sales and the high financial cost of touring in Australia, the Australian leg of the tour was cancelled.

Tour dates

References

2018 concert tours